Daniel John DiLorenzo is a medical device entrepreneur and physician-scientist. He is the inventor of several technologies for the treatment of neurological disease and is the founder of several companies which are developing technologies to treat epilepsy and other medical diseases and improve the quality of life of afflicted patients.

Early life
DiLorenzo studied at MIT, receiving a B.S. and M.S. in electrical engineering, M.S. in health sciences and technology, an M.B.A./M.S. in the Management of Technology from the MIT Sloan School of Management, and a Ph.D. in mechanical engineering, with a focus on neurophysiology, control theory, and implantable neural interfaces.  He also received the M.D. degree from Harvard Medical School. 

As a 1st grader, DiLorenzo decided to forego the opportunity to attend summer camp. Instead, he spent his summer building a robot with telescoping arms that had the ability to shoot rockets. DiLorenzo functions on zero to four hours of sleep and routinely is awake between the hours of one to three AM.

DiLorenzo developed closed-loop neuromodulation technology on his own while a student at MIT and developed several technologies for the treatment of neurological disease, including a gait restoration system for paraplegics, a peripheral nerve interface for amputees, among others.

Career
DiLorenzo is the inventor of novel devices and methods for the treatment of patients with epilepsy. Based upon his inventions, he founded NeuroVista Corporation while a Neurosurgery resident in 2002 (formerly known as BioNeuronics, Seattle, WA) and which has developed and successfully demonstrated a novel brain monitoring technology that is capable of predicting seizures in patients with epilepsy.    

While at BioNeuronics, an early-stage medical device company developing devices for epilepsy, he also founded DiLorenzo Biomedical, a medical device company developing novel therapies for obesity and other medical conditions.

He is the editor of the Textbook "Neuroengineering", which provides an overview of the new technologies, surgical techniques, and clinical indications of neuroengineering.

Awards
DiLorenzo is the recipient of several awards related to invention and innovation.  He won the MIT-Lemelson $30,000 Student Prize, was included in the TR100 list of 100 young innovators, was featured in Entrepreneur Magazine as an innovator in business, and was included in the Seattle 40 under 40 Leaders in Business.

In 1999 DiLorenzo received the Lemelson-MIT Student Prize
In 1999 DiLorenzo was named in the first cohort of the TR100, a listing of the top 100 innovators in the country under the age of 35 Daniel DiLorenzo TR100 Technology Review
In 2000 DiLorenzo was featured in Entrepreneur Magazine as  "The New Genius"
In 2005 DiLorenzo was named in the Seattle business "40 under 40" business leaders by the Puget Sound Business Journal, for his role in founding BioNeuronics and civic activities.

External links
MITWorld 2005 Innovation Forum
SCCtv Entrepreneurs & Innovators Interview
BioNeuronics Founder (now NeuroVista)
Technology Review TR100 Young Innovators
VentureBeat on NeuroVista Founder & Financing
Seattle 40 Under 40 - DiLorenzo's Early Tinkering leads to a Medical Device company
The Methodist Hospital - Neurosurgery Resident Training

References

21st-century American inventors
Harvard Medical School alumni
Lemelson–MIT Prize
MIT School of Engineering alumni
MIT Sloan School of Management alumni
Year of birth missing (living people)
Living people